Hodierna is an English and French feminine given name derived from Latin, meaning daily.

The name has been conjectured to come from the phrase 'Deus cuius hodierna die', in the collects for the Innocents and Epiphany.

People with the given name
 Hodierna of Gometz (died 1108), French noblewoman 
 Hodierna of Jerusalem (1110–1164), countess consort of Tripoli
 Hodierna of St Albans ( 1150–1210), mother of Alexander Neckam and wet nurse to Richard I of England

People with the surname
 Giovanni Battista Hodierna (1597–1660), astronomer

References 

English feminine given names
English-language surnames
French feminine given names
French-language surnames